Nina Lilian Etkin (June 13, 1948 – January 26, 2009) was an anthropologist and biologist. Etkin was noted for her work in medical anthropology, ethnobiology, and ethnopharmacology.  She studied the relation between food and health for over thirty years. Her work involved complementary and alternative medicines for prevention and treatment in Hawai‘i; the use of ethnomedicines in Indonesia; and health issues in Nigeria. She won numerous grants and awards from national and international agencies and published several books as well as over 80 professional articles in peer reviewed journals.

Education and academic career
Etkin earned her undergraduate degree in zoology from Indiana University in 1970 and her MA and PhD in Anthropology in 1972 and 1975 from Washington University in St. Louis, Missouri.

Academic positions
Assistant Professor of Anthropology, University of Minnesota, 1979–1983
Associate Professor, University of Minnesota, 1983–1990
Associate Professor of Anthropology, University of Hawai‘i at Mānoa, 1990–1994
Full Professor of Anthropology, University of Hawai‘i at Mānoa, 1994–2009.
Chair of the Department of Anthropology, University of Hawai‘i at Mānoa, 2001–2002

She was also a member of the medical faculty of the University of Hawai‘i.

Awards and honors
Etkin served as Editor in Chief of Economic Botany, the journal of the Society for Economic Botany.

She was a Fellow of the Linnean Society and a past president and honorary board member of the International Society for Ethnopharmacology.

Etkin won the 2009 Distinguished Economic Botanist Award from the Society for Economic Botany.

Publications

Books
Plants in Indigenous Medicine & Diet: Biobehavioral Approaches, 1986
Eating on the Wild Side: The Pharmacologic, Ecologic, and Social Implications of Using Noncultigens, 1994
Edible Medicines: An Ethnopharmacology of Food, 2006
Foods of Association:  Biocultural Perspectives on Food and Beverages that Mediate Sociability, 2009

Memorials

 The Nina L. Etkin Memorial Fund supports graduate students at the University of Hawai‘i at Mānoa, “particularly those working in biocultural and medical anthropology”.
 The UHM Campus Arboretum has an Akee tree (Blighia sapida) as a memorial namesake tree dedicated with a plaque; the species chosen reflects her research interest in cultural plant exchanges between Africa and the Caribbean.
 A special issue of the newsletter of the International Society for Ethnopharmacology in 2009 collected testimonials from her students and colleagues.

References

External links
Nina L. Etkin Memorial Fund

1948 births
2009 deaths
American women anthropologists
American botanists
University of Hawaiʻi faculty
University of Minnesota faculty
Washington University in St. Louis alumni
Ethnobiologists
Indiana University alumni
Fellows of the Linnean Society of London
Economic botanists
20th-century American women scientists
20th-century American anthropologists